Coconut jelly may refer to:
Young coconut meat
Nata de coco, or "coconut gel", a chewy, translucent, jelly-like food product produced by the bacterial fermentation of coconut water